Robert Bowen may refer to:
 Robert Bowen (politician) (born 1948), Colorado state legislator
 Robert O. Bowen (1920–2003), American novelist and essayist
 Robert Sidney Bowen (1900–1977), World War I aviator, journalist and author
 Rob Bowen (born 1981), baseball catcher
 Rufus Bowen (Robert Edward Bowen, 1947–1978), professor of mathematics